Rib Falls (also known as Big Rib Falls) is an unincorporated community located in the town of Rib Falls, Marathon County, Wisconsin, United States. The community was named for the river, which takes its name from the English translation of the original Ojibwa name O-pik-wun-a Se-be.

References

Unincorporated communities in Marathon County, Wisconsin
Unincorporated communities in Wisconsin